The 2019–20 Rugby Europe Trophy is the second-level rugby union competition below the premier Championship. It is the fourth Trophy competition under its new format, that will see Lithuania, Netherlands, Poland, and Switzerland compete for the title, and a place in the Championship–Trophy promotion play-off.

This year's competition sees Ukraine joining the Trophy after winning its division in Conference 1 North. After the Championship–Trophy promotion play-off of the 2018–19 season, which was played on 15 June 2019 between Portugal and Germany, Portugal was promoted after its third try and Germany relegated to the Trophy level.

Table 
{| class="wikitable"
|-width=10px bgcolor="#ccffcc"
|Champions and advances toPromotion/relegation play-off
|-
|}

Fixtures

Relegation/promotion play-off

Top scorers

Top points scorers

Top try scorers

See also 
 Rugby Europe International Championships
 2019–20 Rugby Europe International Championships
 Six Nations Championship
 Antim Cup

References

External links
 Rugby Europe official website

2019–20 Rugby Europe International Championships
2019-20